Robert Roper (1757–1838) was an English architect who practised from Preston, Lancashire.  His work was mainly on churches and country houses in the northwest of England.  The list is likely to be incomplete.

Key

Principal works

References

Bibliography

Lists of buildings and structures by architect